Al-Mundhir (c. 842 – 888) was Emir of Córdoba from 886 to 888. He was a member of the Umayyad dynasty of Al-Andalus (Moorish Iberia), the son of Muhamad bin Abd al-Rahman.

Biography

Born in Córdoba, during the reign of his father he commanded the military operations against the neighbouring Christian kingdoms and the Muwallad rebellions.

In 865 he led the partially failed campaign against King Ordoño I of Asturias, in the Duero valley. On his way back to Córdoba, he defeated Rodrigo, count of Castile, at Burgos, pushing the Cordoban frontier northwards. He also tried to conquer León, but he was defeated in 878 at Valdemora, by king Alfonso III of Asturias.

Al-Mundhir launched an expedition against the Banu Qasi Muwallad family, who had allied with Alfonso III, but was again defeated in 883. The following year he was, however, able to expel the rebel emir Ibn Marwan from Badajoz.

In 886, upon his father's death, he inherited the throne of Córdoba. During the two years of his reign al-Mundhir continued the fight against the rebel Umar ibn Hafsun. He died in 888 at Bobastro, possibly murdered by his brother Abdullah ibn Muhammad al-Umawi, who succeeded him.

Sources

840s births
888 deaths
Year of birth uncertain
Emirs of Córdoba
9th-century rulers in Europe
9th-century Arabs
People from Córdoba, Spain